Kontradmirał Włodzimierz Steyer (July 15, 1892 – September 15, 1957) was a Polish naval officer before and during the Second World War. During the Invasion of Poland in 1939 he commanded the Polish land forces defending the Hel Peninsula in what became known as the Battle of Hel, the longest-lasting battle of the campaign. After the war he briefly served as the commanding officer of the entire Polish Navy. Steyer was also an author of novels under the pen-name "Brunon Dzimicz".

Biography

Early life 
Włodzimierz Brunon Steyer was born in Montreal, Canada, to Włodzimierz Steyer Sr. and Tekla (née Witołd-Aleksandrowicz). Early in his childhood Steyer with his parents moved to Saint Petersburg in Russia.

Russian navy 
In 1913 he graduated from the Naval Cadet Corps, and then a course on naval gunnery. On that ship he took part in a spectacular cruise from the Pacific to the Mediterranean in 1915, and then the naval operations in the Dardanelles Campaign. In 1917 he was wounded by shrapnel and withdrawn to Finland, where he served on several smaller ships of the Murmansk Flotilla.

Polish military 
In 1919 Steyer arrived in Poland and volunteered for the Polish Army. As the Polish forces lacked skilled naval officers, Steyer was quickly promoted and became the deputy commanding officer of the Military Port of Modlin. As the Polish Navy lacked ships, and there were no naval operations during the Polish-Bolshevik War, in 1920 Steyer formed a battalion out of naval NCOs and volunteered for the front-line service in the land forces. However, his unit arrived to the front shortly before the cease-fire and did not take part in the hostilities.

Between 1921 and 1922 he was the headmaster of the Temporary Course for Naval Officers, the predecessor of the Academy of the Polish Navy. Afterwards he became the commanding officer of the school ship . In 1924 he became the commanding officer of the gunship , and then in 1926 of the torpedo boat . The same year he graduated from the École des officiers canonniers in Toulon.

Soon afterwards he retired from active service and joined the Polish Merchant Marine, where he served as an officer aboard . He was then briefly a director of an Arms and Artillery Department at the Naval HQ, and the commanding officer of Mazur. Upon their arrival in Poland, both were pressed into service in the newly formed Destroyer Division, of which Steyer was the commanding officer between 1933 and 1935.

Afterwards Steyer became the commander of the Gdynia naval base. At the same time he also headed the delivery commission of a series of the s (based on the successful ), the s and heavy minelayer . From 1937 he commanded the Hel Fortified Area.

At that post Steyer served during the German Invasion of 1939, defending the area between September 1 and October 2, 1939. The units under his command were among the last ones to capitulate in 1939. Taken prisoner of war by Nazi Germany, Steyer spent the rest of the war in various prisoner-of-war camps, including Stalag X-C Nienburg, Oflag XVIII-C Spittal, Oflag II-C Woldenberg and Oflag X-C Lübeck, from where he was liberated by British troops in 1945.

Steyer was one of the few officers to return to communist-controlled Poland, and join the recreated Polish Navy. Initially a commander of the demolished port of Gdynia, in 1946 he headed a mission to Moscow, where he signed an agreement with the Soviet government, which leased 23 ships to Poland. Then he commanded the Szczecin Military Area and in 1947 became the commander of the entire Polish Navy.

Following dismissal 
Unable to make his living on his officer's pension, Steyer started working as an ordinary clerk in the PKO bank in Gdynia and Ostrołęka. During Khrushchev's Thaw, in 1957, he was given a flat in Wrzeszcz, Gdańsk and he finally retired. However, a month later he was hospitalized, and died on September 15, 1957. He was buried with military honours at the Defenders of the Coast Cemetery in Redłowo, Gdynia.

Publications 
By the 1930s Steyer had already begun his career as a writer. He translated a number of articles on naval issues and had them published in a variety of newspapers. He also published a series of maritime novels under the pen-name of Brunon Dzimicz. Among his works are Samotny krążownik (Lone Cruiser, 1934), Skaza marynarska (Seaman's Taint, 1937), Eskadra niescalona (Unintegrated Escadrille, 1939), Przygody mata Moreli (The Adventures of Corporal Morela, 1947) and Samotny półwysep (Lone Peninsula, 1957).

Awards
Among his awards are the Silver Cross of Virtuti Militari, the Commander's and Officer's Crosses of Polonia Restituta, Golden Cross of Merit and the Medal of Independence.

References 
 
 

1892 births
1957 deaths
Writers from Montreal
Polish Navy admirals
Polish male writers
Recipients of the Silver Cross of the Virtuti Militari
Commanders of the Order of Polonia Restituta
Recipients of the Gold Cross of Merit (Poland)
Recipients of the Cross of Independence
Prisoners of Oflag II-C